Haddush Addi may refer to:

 The Haddush Addi massacre near Wukro Maray in Tigray in 2021
 The village of Haddush Addi in Seret (Dogu'a Tembien) in Tigray

Populated places in the Tigray Region